I, Tina: My Life Story is a 1986 autobiography by Tina Turner, co-written by MTV news correspondent and music critic Kurt Loder. The book was reissued by Dey Street Books in 2010.

Content 

The book details Tina Turner's story from her childhood in Nutbush, Tennessee to her initial rise to fame in St. Louis under the leadership of blues musician Ike Turner which became an abusive marriage, leading up to her resurgence in the 1980s.

Contributors 
The book contains passages from many of Turner's family, friends and associates, among those are:

 Joe Bihari 
 Bonnie Bramlett 
 Alline Bullock 
 Zelma Bullock (Tina's mother)
 Roger Davies 
 Venetta Fields 
 Rhonda Graam (Ike & Tina's road manager)
 Bob Gruen 
Raymond Hill 
 Bob Krasnow 
 Clayton Love 
Robbie Montgomery 
 Juggy Murray 
 Harry Taylor (Tina's first love)
 Craig Turner (Tina's son with Raymond Hill)
 Ike Turner 
 Ike Turner Jr. (Tina's adopted son)
 Ronnie Turner (Tina's son with Ike Turner)
 Gene Washington (Kings of Rhythm drummer / boyfriend of Tina's sister Alline)

Reception 
The book became a worldwide best-seller when it was released and led to the film adaptation, What's Love Got to Do with It, in 1993 starring Angela Bassett as Turner.

In 1999, Ike Turner released his own autobiography, Takin' Back My Name, which in part is a rebuttal of the image presented of him in Tina's book and the film.

References

African-American autobiographies
Music autobiographies
1986 non-fiction books
Tina Turner
Autobiographies adapted into films
Books about singers
Literature by African-American women